Camellia Institute of Technology & Management, commonly known as CITM,  is an autonomous private degree engineering college in West Bengal, India, situated in Boinchi, Hooghly.
The institute is affiliated with Maulana Abul Kalam Azad University of Technology (formally known as WBUT). It is recognised by the Government of West Bengal and its courses are approved by the All India Council for Technical Education (AICTE).

Courses

Btech in
 Civil Engineering
 Computer Science and Engineering
 Electronics and Communication Engineering
 Electrical Engineering
 Mechanical Engineering

Diploma courses
 Civil Engineering
 Mechanical Engineering

Hostel
There is a hostel inside of the college campus for students.

Admission
Admission to the B.Tech courses is on the basis of the position secured by the candidate in the West Bengal Joint Entrance Examination And Joint Entrance Examination – Main.

In all courses, 90% of students of approved intake capacity are admitted on the basis of merit position secured by the candidate in West Bengal Joint Entrance Examination. The 10% balance of students are admitted from Joint Entrance Examination – Main as per the norms stipulated by the UGC and the West Bengal.Diploma holders in any engineering and technical discipline can enter for a degree course in the second year at CITM, through the admission test JELET conducted by Central Selection Committee (CSC).
Among these, some (1 or 2) seats are also available for Reserved Category, Tuition Fee Waiver (TFW) and PwD candidates.

References

Universities and colleges in Hooghly district
Educational institutions established in 2009
2009 establishments in West Bengal
Colleges affiliated to West Bengal University of Technology